Kin Sang may refer to:

Places 

 Kin Sang Estate, a public housing estate in Tuen Mun, Hong Kong
 Kin Sang stop, an MTR Light Rail stop adjacent to the estate

People 

 Loong Kin Sang (born 1944), Cantonese opera performer from Hong Kong